Maj-Britt Bergqvist was a Swedish sprint canoeist who competed in the late 1930s. She won a silver medal in the K-1 600m event at the 1938 ICF Canoe Sprint World Championships in Vaxholm.

References

20th-century Swedish people
Swedish female canoeists
Year of birth missing
ICF Canoe Sprint World Championships medalists in kayak